The 1966 Campeonato Nacional de Fútbol Profesional, was the 34th season of top-flight football in Chile. Universidad Católica won their fourth title following a 4–2 win against Unión San Felipe on the 32nd matchday, also qualifying for the 1967 Copa Libertadores.

League table

Results

Topscorer

References

External links
ANFP 
RSSSF Chile 1966

Primera División de Chile seasons
Chile
Prim